Ross Benjamin is an American translator of German literature and a 2015 Guggenheim Fellow. He has won the Helen and Kurt Wolff Translator's Prize for his translation of Michael Maar's Speak, Nabokov. He also received a commendation from the judges of the Schlegel-Tieck Prize for his translation of Thomas Pletzinger's Funeral for a Dog. He is a graduate of Vassar College and a former Fulbright scholar.

His translation of Daniel Kehlmann's novel Tyll (2017) was shortlisted for the 2020 International Booker Prize.

Benjamin has written for the Times Literary Supplement, The Nation, etc. He lives in Nyack, New York.

The Times of London referred to Benjamin as a "Comic Virtuoso" for his work on Tyll by Daniel Kehlmann.

He is the son of attorney Jeff Benjamin and LCSW Betsy Benjamin.

Translations 
 Speak, Nabokov by Michael Maar
 Funeral for a Dog by Thomas Pletzinger
 Hyperion by Friedrich Hölderlin
 Close to Jedenew by Kevin Vennemann
 Job: The Story of a Simple Man by Joseph Roth
 The Frequencies by Clemens J. Setz (National Endowment for the Arts Literature Fellowship)
 And Then Life Happens: A Memoir by Auma Obama
 The Cusanus Game by Wolfgang Jeschke
 The Lone Assassin by 
 When I Fell from the Sky by Juliane Koepcke
 War Games: A History of War on Paper by Philipp von Hilgers
 We Are All Stardust by Stefan Klein
 Indigo by Clemens J. Setz
You Should Have Left by Daniel Kehlmann
 Tyll by Daniel Kehlmann 
 Diaries of Franz Kafka

References

Year of birth missing (living people)
Living people
21st-century American translators
German–English translators
Vassar College alumni